Summerhill Hounds is a novel by Robert King published by TSR in 1995.

Plot summary
Summerhill Hounds is a story in TSR's First Quest series meant for children; it is an adventure about a pack of hounds that
populates a vast fortress.

Reception
Gideon Kibblewhite reviewed Summerhill Hounds for Arcane magazine, rating it a 3 out of 10 overall. Kibblewhite comments that "Alas, this shaggy tale is not nearly amazing, frightening or funny enough to entertain the average youngster. This is cuddly but pale pup fiction that falls short of the standards set by both classic and modern children's fantasy."

References

1995 novels